Persatuan Sepakbola Bima Sakti (simply known as PS Bima Sakti) is an Indonesian football club based in Mataram (city), West Nusa Tenggara. They currently competes in Liga 3.

Honours
 Liga 3 West Nusa Tenggara
 Runner-up: 2021

References

External links

Sport in West Nusa Tenggara
Football clubs in Indonesia
Football clubs in West Nusa Tenggara
Association football clubs established in 1995
1995 establishments in Indonesia